WCJX (106.5 FM) is a hot adult contemporary–formatted radio station licensed to Five Points, Florida, United States, and  primarily serving the Lake City and Live Oak area. The station is owned by Southern Stone Communications as part of a conglomerate with Live Oak–licensed News Talk Information station WQHL (1250 AM), Live Oak–licensed country music station WQHL-FM (98.1 FM), and Live Oak–licensed sports radio station WJZS; WCJX is also sister to Lake City–licensed News Talk Information station WDSR (1340 AM) and Lake City–licensed classic hits station WNFB (94.3 FM) under a local marketing agreement with their owner Newman Media, Inc.

History

WCJX previously broadcast a classic hits format under the branding 106.5 The X and later 106.5 The Lake. On December 26, 2022, WCJX swapped formats with WNFB. WNFB inherited WCJX's classic hits format and The Lake branding, while WCJX took on 94.3's hot adult contemporary format and Mix branding.

References

External links

CJX
Hot adult contemporary radio stations in the United States
Radio stations established in 1998
1971 establishments in Florida